In mathematics, Heckman–Opdam polynomials (sometimes called Jacobi polynomials) Pλ(k) are orthogonal polynomials in several variables associated to root systems.

They generalize Jack polynomials  when the roots system is of type A, and are limits of Macdonald polynomials Pλ(q, t) as q tends to 1 and (1 − t)/(1 − q) tends to k.
Main properties of the Heckman–Opdam polynomials have been detailed by Siddhartha Sahi

References

Orthogonal polynomials